Anshu Singh (7 July 1935 – 8 March 2021) was an Indian politician who served as governor of Rajasthan. He was governor of the state from January 1999 to May 2003. Earlier he was governor of Gujarat state in 1998.

Biography
Born in 1935 in Allahabad he studied arts and law and first became the advocate in Allahabad district court in 1957. He was appointed judge of Allahabad High Court in 1984 and later became  justice of Rajasthan High Court.

He died from COVID-19 during the COVID-19 pandemic in India.

References

External links
 Anshuman Singh

Governors of Rajasthan
1935 births
2021 deaths
Uttar Pradesh politicians
Politicians from Allahabad
Governors of Gujarat
Judges of the Allahabad High Court
Chief Justices of the Rajasthan High Court
20th-century Indian judges
Deaths from the COVID-19 pandemic in India